Jhonatan Longhi (born February 2, 1988) is an alpine skier from Brazil.  He competed for Brazil at the 2010 Winter Olympics.  His best result was a 56th place in the giant slalom.

References

External links

1988 births
Living people
Brazilian male alpine skiers
Olympic alpine skiers of Brazil
Alpine skiers at the 2010 Winter Olympics
Alpine skiers at the 2014 Winter Olympics
Sportspeople from São Paulo